Wild Mussels is a 2000 Dutch drama film directed by Erik de Bruyn. It was entered into the 23rd Moscow International Film Festival.

Cast
 Fedja van Huêt as Leen
 Frank Lammers as Daan
 Frederik Brom as Jacob (as Freek Brom)
 Will van Kralingen as Noortje
 Josse De Pauw as Wannes
 Angelique de Bruijne as Janine
 Melek Karasu as Atash
 Martin Dunne as Nowhere Man
 Hans Veerman as Rinus
 Freark Smink as Bert
 Marina de Graaf as Diana

References

External links
 

2000 films
2000 drama films
Dutch drama films
2000s Dutch-language films